CFDP can stand for:

 CCSDS File Delivery Protocol 
 Coherent file distribution protocol